Denis John Worrall (born 29 May 1935 in Benoni, Transvaal, Union of South Africa) is a South African academic, businessman, and former politician and diplomat.

Life and career

Worrall was appointed as a Senator for the Cape Province in 1974, representing the segregationist National Party. He was subsequently elected to the House of Assembly as National Party MP for Cape Town Gardens. He was chairman of the Constitutional Committee of the President's Council until 1982, and was Ambassador to Australia from 1982 to 1984, and then Ambassador to the United Kingdom from 1984 to 1987.

As a member of the NP's relatively moderate faction, Worrall objected to the shift from reform to security after 1985. He resigned his post in order to return to South Africa and enter politics again, standing as an independent against the senior government minister Chris Heunis in the Helderberg constituency in the 1987 election, but lost by 39 votes. Worrall then formed the conservative but anti-apartheid Independent Party with Wynand Malan in 1988. He subsequently became one of the three co-leaders of the Democratic Party, and won the Berea constituency for the DP in the 1989 election.

Worrall taught at universities in South Africa (University of Natal and University of the Witwatersrand), Nigeria, and the United States and edited the first general textbook on the South African government and politics.

Worrall is the former Vice Chairman of the International Bank of Southern Africa, former chairman of the Australian mining company Crown Diamonds N.L., director of several other companies and a consultant to the World Bank and several multinational corporations.

In 2015, Worrall founded The Cape Messenger, an online daily newspaper with a focus on business and politics in South Africa.

References

1935 births
Living people
People from Benoni
South African diplomats
Ambassadors of South Africa to Australia
Independent Party (South Africa) politicians
Democratic Party (South Africa) politicians
Ambassadors of South Africa to the United Kingdom
University of Cape Town alumni
Cornell University alumni